Sylvia Nayebale, (born 22 November 1990) is a Ugandan journalist, businesswoman and politician, who serves as the incumbent Member of Parliament representing the Gomba District Women Constituency in the 10th Ugandan Parliament (2016 to 2021). She was re elected in 2021 in the same position.

Background and education
She was born on 22 November 1990, in Gomba District, in the Buganda Region of Uganda. She attended local schools for her primary education. She studied at Nabisunsa Girls' Secondary School for her O-Level and A-Level schooling. In 2008, she was admitted to Makerere University, Uganda's oldest and largest public university, graduating in 2011, with a Bachelor of Mass Communication degree.

Work experience
Prior to joining full-time politics, she worked as a receptionist at Royal Suites, a hospitality establishment. During her final undergraduate year, she worked as a news reporter for Uganda Broadcasting Corporation, the government-owned media house.

For a two-year period, between 2011 and 2013, Sylvia served as the personal assistant to the Minister for State for Economic Monitoring in the Office of the President of Uganda. In 2013 she was elected Chairperson of Gomba Action for Development, a non-government organisation, where she still serves as of October 2018.

Political career
During the 2016 national election cycle, Ms. Sylvia Nayebale won the Gomba District women's constituency, on the ruling National Resistance Movement political party, and is the current incumbent member of parliament, for that constituency.

During the NRM primaries, Nayebale beat the then incumbent member of parliament, Nakato Kyabangi who polled 9,297 votes to Nayebale's 21,835 votes. In the 10th Ugandan Parliament she is a member of the Parliamentary Committee on Health and of the Parliamentary Committee on HIV/AIDS and Related Diseases.

Family
Ms. Sylvia Nayebale is married.

See also
 Anna Ebaju Adeke
 Winnie Kiiza
 Lillian Nakate

References

External links
Website of the Parliament of Uganda
Meet Nayebale Sylvia, Uganda’s Hottest Female MP; She Deserves To Be a Minister

Living people
1990 births
National Resistance Movement politicians
People from Gomba District
People from Central Region, Uganda
21st-century Ugandan women politicians
21st-century Ugandan politicians
Makerere University alumni
Ugandan journalists
Ugandan women journalists
Members of the Parliament of Uganda
Women members of the Parliament of Uganda
People educated at Nabisunsa Girls' Secondary School